The Battle of Kilometer 7 occurred during the Chaco War between Bolivian forces commanded by Lt Col Bernardino Bilbao Rioja defending Fort Saavedra and Paraguayan forces under Col José Félix Estigarribia, from 7 November 1932 to February 1933, and ended with a Paraguayan retreat to the northeast towards Gondra, later to be the site of the Battle of Campo Jordán. The Paraguayan initiative, which had belonged to the Paraguayans since the beginning of the siege of Boquerón passed to the Bolivian army until the Second Battle of Nanawa in July.

Bibliography 
 Querejazu Calvo, Roberto. Historia de la Guerra del Chaco. (1990) Librería Editorial "Juventud".

Kilómetro Siete
1933 in Bolivia
1933 in Paraguay
November 1932 events
December 1932 events
January 1933 events
February 1933 events
History of Presidente Hayes Department